"Take One Last Breath" (formerly known as "Pedestrians Is Another Word for Speedbump") is a song by Canadian metalcore band Abandon All Ships. It was released as the first single from their debut album, Geeving. The single was released on iTunes on June 29, 2010, followed by the music video being released on June 30, 2010, where it premiered on VH1.

Background
The song was written by the group prior to the release of their self-titled EP. At that time, "Take One Last Breath" was titled "Pedestrians Is Another Word for Speedbump". Angelo Aita explained that the song name was changed because the band "changed the song completely...so it's like a new name for a new song" and that Universal Music Canada, "wanted [Abandon All Ships] to shorten [the song title] because it was really long."

Music video 
The music video premiered on VH1 on August 27, 2010 and on MTV's Headbangers Ball on August 24, 2010. 

The music video for the song was directed by Davin Black of 235films, and is a performance-only style music video. It primarily features the band performing either on the ground, or on higher platforms with their instruments. A behind-the-scenes video was posted to Abandon All Ships' YouTube page on July 5, 2010, showing a dispute about lasers that were apparently supposed to be in the video.

Re-recorded differences 
The differences between "Take One Last Breath" and "Pedestrians Is Another Word for Speedbump" are minor. A main difference is that "Take One Last Breath" is longer by 21 seconds, and does not include the synth patches from "Pedestrians" during the breakdown. The middle part of the song where is says "captain captain, before the sail rips" repeats three times in "Pedestrians", yet is said only twice in "Take One Last Breath", first "captain captain, before the sail rips", then "captain captain, I can see enemy ships" before repeating the first term. Lastly, "Pedestrians" does not repeat the chorus at the end, but simply ends with the breakdown.

Track listing
"Take One Last Breath" (video version) — 3:39
"Take One Last Breath" (album version) — 3:45

Charts

References

2010 singles
Abandon All Ships songs
2010 songs
Universal Music Canada singles